Emmanuel Bonami is a French actor in numerous films and television series, and an art director in video games. He is also known as a voice actor for dubbing in French characters in movies and video games, most notably for his role as Solid Snake in Metal Gear Solid.

Early life
Bonami was living in London prior to his first dubbings, but also in Turkey, and Ukraine in his life.

Career

Voice actor and Metal Gear Solid (1997-2004)
Bonami's earliest participation as a voice actor was in 1997's Ghost in the Shell for its French dubbing. As one of his friend was working on the European localization of Metal Gear Solid with Konami, Bonami went in time to participate in the French dub of the titular game in Summer 1998. At the time of the recording, there were no English dub produced yet, and went on working with the Japanese version of the game along with one of Konami's Japanese project manager. Though the franchise did not receive dubs in other languages since Metal Gear Solid 2: Sons of Liberty, Bonami would unofficially dub Snake occasionally, such as the introduction scenes of Metal Gear Solid 4: Guns of the Patriots, and Metal Gear Solid V: The Phantom Pain. After participating in this project, he would continue working as a voice actor for dubbing video games characters, such as Half-Life 2: Episode Two with Father Grigori in 2007, and Tom Clancy's Splinter Cell: Conviction in 2010.

Actor (2005-present)
Bonami moved out to Paris later in 2005. Shortly after, he has started working as an actor for movies and television shows, such as Wolf in 2019's Fornacis, and the eponymous character in 2014's lucid horror movie Horsehead. In 2011, he has announced in an interview that he was making a short movie named Innocence. In 2018, he played the antagonist Zerda in the short TV series and adaptation of Michel Bussi's The Double Mother, Mother Is Wrong, in which he was marked by the scenario of both the book and its adaptation, and the character. In an interview held in September 2021, Bonami explained that he goes through numerous castings in various media, and works with a group of friends in short films.

Roles

Movies

Short films

TV Series

Animation

Video games

Other roles

References

External links

 Emmanuel Bonami profile at MobyGames

Year of birth missing (living people)
Living people
French male voice actors